Ryan Orion Hackett (born July 30, 1982) is an American stock car racing driver.

Racing career
Hackett started racing go-karts as a child at Stateline Speedway in King George, Virginia and by age 15 had won his first track championship. In 1998 at 16, he started racing dirt late model cars at Virginia Motor Speedway and Potomac Speedway.  In most races, he was the youngest competitor in the field, racing against 30- to 40-year-old men. He won his first dirt late model race in 1999 at the age of 17.

ARCA Re/Max Series
Hackett continued to race NASCAR late models and, in 2005, he competed in his first race in the ARCA RE/MAX Series, racing in the Hantz Group 200 at Michigan International Speedway. Hackett would start the race in 29th position and finish 12th, earning the race's "Hard Charger Award."  He would race in another five ARCA events in the next three years, finishing 12th in the 2006 Pocono 200 at Pocono Raceway, 16th in the 2006 Hantz Group 200 at Michigan, and 14th at the 2008 Kentuckiana Ford Dealers 200 at Salem Speedway.

NASCAR

2008 season
In 2008 Hackett raced in his first NASCAR Nationwide Series race, the Lipton Tea 250, at Richmond International Raceway. He would start 43rd and finish the race 35th. Later in the season, he ran his first Craftsman Truck Series race, the Ford 200 at Homestead-Miami Speedway. He qualified 26th, but his day was cut short due to engine troubles and he finished 34th.

2009 season
For his father's team, Hackett would race in seven Camping World Truck Series while also attempting two NASCAR Nationwide Series events.  Hackett scored his first top twenty of his NASCAR career with an 18th-place finish in the North Carolina Education Lottery 200 at Lowe's Motor Speedway in May.  The following race at Dover, he scored his best qualifying position of 21st.  Hackett would lead the first laps of his NASCAR career in the Michigan 200 at Michigan International Speedway and ran in the top ten before an accident cut his day short. For his efforts, Hackett was awarded the "WIX Lap Leader Award" for the race.  Hackett made his superspeedway debut in the Mountain Dew 250 at Talladega. He made an impressive run in practice, finishing with the 4th quickest overall time/speed. However, his race was ended prematurely as he had axle problems end his day after only half of the race was complete.

2010 season
In mid January 2010, Hackett announced that his team would attempt the season opening NextEra Energy Resources 250 at the historic Daytona International Speedway.  This would mark Hackett's first ever visit to the famed track in any series. Hackett also announced that Sears Sand & Gravel of Gloucester, Virginia would serve as primary sponsor of the truck at Daytona.  He would qualify for the race in the 27th spot and finish the race with a career best 15th-place result.  Hackett would race in the following weeks E-Z-GO 200 at Atlanta Motor Speedway where he would start the race 27th and finish in 30th after a broken crossmember.

2011 season
Hackett would attempt just one race in the 2011 Camping World Truck Series season in the Coca-Cola 250 at Talladega.  Hackett would start the race in 30th position and would finish on the lead lap in 22nd place.

2012 season
In 2012, Hackett would once again make his only Truck Series appearance of the season at Talladega in the Fred's 250.  He would once again start in 30th position and finish again on the lead lap, however this time improving his finish position to 17th.  Hackett would also run a near full schedule at Potomac Speedway finishing 4th in points in the Super Late Model Division and 2nd in points, with two wins in the Late Model Division despite only running a partial schedule.

Motorsports career results

NASCAR
(key) (Bold – Pole position awarded by qualifying time. Italics – Pole position earned by points standings or practice time. * – Most laps led.)

Nationwide Series

Camping World Truck Series

ARCA Re/Max Series
(key) (Bold – Pole position awarded by qualifying time. Italics – Pole position earned by points standings or practice time. * – Most laps led.)

References

External links
 
 

Living people
1982 births
People from La Plata, Maryland
Racing drivers from Maryland
NASCAR drivers
ARCA Menards Series drivers